Leicester Aylestone Road Greyhound Track was a greyhound racing stadium on Aylestone Road, Leicester.

Origins
The track was constructed on the Agricultural Show Grounds, on the south side of the Aylestone Road County Cricket Ground which was used by Leicestershire County Cricket Club at the time.

Opening
The opening night was on 24 September 1927.

Closure
The racing was short-lived and only lasted until 1929 but was under the National Greyhound Racing Club banner at some stage.

References

Defunct greyhound racing venues in the United Kingdom